All of the 8 Minnesota incumbents were re-elected.

See also 
 List of United States representatives from Minnesota
 United States House of Representatives elections, 1972

1972
Minnesota
1972 Minnesota elections